Alberto Fernández (born 1959) is an Argentine politician, President of this country since 10 December 2019

Alberto Fernandez may also refer to:
Alberto Fernández (footballer, born 1943), Spanish former footballer
Alberto Fernández de Rosa (born 1944), Argentine actor
Alberto Fernández (cyclist) (1955–1984), Spanish cyclist
Alberto Fernandez (diplomat) (born 1958), United States official and diplomat
Alberto Fernández Díaz (born 1961), Spanish politician
Alberto Fernández (sport shooter) (born 1983), Spanish trap shooter
Alberto Fernández de la Puebla (born 1984), Spanish cyclist
Alberto Fernández (footballer, born 1999), Spanish footballer
Alberto Fernández (basketball), Peruvian Olympic basketball player